"Under the Bridges of Paris" is a 1913 popular song with music written by Vincent Scotto, the original French lyrics (entitled "Sous les ponts de Paris") by Jean Rodor (1913), and English sections of lyrics added by Dorcas Cochran (1952) resulting in the released version (1954) containing both French and English  sections.

Background
Recordings by both Eartha Kitt (released as a B-side to "Santa Baby") and Dean Martin charted in the United Kingdom in 1955, but failed to chart in the United States, though both were subsequently released as LP album tracks as well.

The recording by Eartha Kitt with Henri René and his orchestra and chorus was made in New York City on October 25, 1953. It was released by RCA Victor Records as catalogue number 20-5502 (in USA) and by EMI on the His Master's Voice label as catalogue number B 10647. Kitt's recording appears on her 1954 album That Bad Eartha.

Michel Legrand recorded a jazz trio version of the song for his Paris-themed album of 1960, Legrand Piano. It was also performed by Polish singer Violetta Villas during her Las Vegas shows in late 60s.

References

Songs with lyrics by Dorcas Cochran
1913 songs
Eartha Kitt songs
Dean Martin songs
Songs about Paris
Songs with music by Vincent Scotto